John Austin Keliher (November 6, 1866 – September 21, 1938) was a U.S. Democratic politician.

He was born in Boston, Massachusetts. He was elected as a Democrat to the United States House of Representatives from Massachusetts and served from March 4, 1903, to March 3, 1911.  Congressman Keliher was the uncle of Brigadier-General John J. Keliher and Rear Admiral Thomas Joseph Keliher.

Defeats in the 1910 congressional election
In 1910 Keliher lost his bid for reelection, first losing in the Democratic primary, and in the general election as an independent candidate, losing both times to William F. Murray.

Sheriff of Suffolk County
On April 11, 1917, the incumbent sheriff of Suffolk County, "Honest John" Quinn, died from diabetes. On April 18, 1917 Governor McCall submitted Keliher's name to the Executive Council to fill the vacancy.  Keliher's appointment was approved by the Executive Council and he was sworn into office on May 3, 1917.   On November 6, 1917 Keliher was elected in his own right and re-elected in every election until 1938.

1917 Massachusetts Constitutional Convention
In 1916 the Massachusetts legislature and electorate approved the calling of a Constitutional Convention.  In May 1917 Keliher was elected to serve as a member of the convention, representing Massachusetts' 11th Congressional District.

Electoral defeat and death
In September 1938 Keliher ran in the primary for renomination as sheriff of Suffolk County. After the returns showed that he was losing the election, he had a heart attack and died in Boston.

Bibliography
Journal of the Constitutional Convention of the Commonwealth of Massachusetts  (1919) pp. 7–8, 865, 971.The Municipal Register for 1918 City of Boston (1918) p. 110.Who's who in State Politics, 1908'' Practical Politics  (1908) p. 14.

References 

1866 births
1938 deaths
Democratic Party members of the Massachusetts House of Representatives
Democratic Party Massachusetts state senators
Sheriffs of Suffolk County, Massachusetts
Members of the 1917 Massachusetts Constitutional Convention
Democratic Party members of the United States House of Representatives from Massachusetts